Limnonectes utara is a species of fanged frogs in the family Dicroglossidae. It can be found in Malaysia (in the states of Perak and Terengganu) and Thailand.

References

 Matsui, Belabut & Ahmad, 2014 : Two new species of fanged frogs from Peninsular Malaysia (Anura: Dicroglossidae) Zootaxa, .
Limnonectes utara Matsui, Belabut, and Ahmad, 2014 | Amphibian Species of the World

utara
Amphibians of Malaysia
Frogs of Asia
Amphibians described in 2014